Borjomi Gorge is a picturesque canyon of the Kura River in central Georgia.  The gorge was formed as a result of the Kura River cutting its path through the Lesser Caucasus Mountains where the Trialeti and Meskheti Ranges meet. A significant portion of the Borjomi Gorge is covered by mixed and coniferous forests made up of oak, maple, beech, spruce, fir, and pine. A large portion of the Borjomi-Kharagauli National Park lies within the gorge, as well as the towns of Likani and Borjomi itself. Baku–Tbilisi–Ceyhan pipeline cuts through the portion of the gorge.

History 
Older books call it the Borzhom or Borjom Defile. About the time of the Russo-Turkish War (1828–29) it was militarily important since it was the natural route southwest through the mountains from Russian-controlled Georgia to the Turkish Pashalik of Akhaltsikhe. It was guarded by a fort or castle called Atskhur.

References

Canyons and gorges of Georgia (country)
Nature conservation in Georgia (country)
Geography of Samtskhe–Javakheti